Teri Helen Hickel (née Hammermaster; born July 6, 1960) is a Republican former member of the Washington House of Representatives. She was elected in 2015 to finish out the term of Roger Freeman, who died. Carol Gregory had been appointed to serve the first year of Freeman's term, which was to be confirmed by special election in 2015. Hickel won that election, but lost re-election in the regular 2016 election to Democrat Kristine Reeves.

Personal life
Hickel and her husband, Tim, also a former state representative, have two children; Mackenzie and Morgan.

Electoral history

References

External links
 Legislative homepage
 Campaign website

1960 births
Living people
Republican Party members of the Washington House of Representatives
People from Federal Way, Washington
Politicians from Puyallup, Washington
Washington State University alumni
Women state legislators in Washington (state)
21st-century American politicians
21st-century American women politicians